Motorway is an online-only used car marketplace based in the UK. It uses a selling platform to allow users to sell their car to dealers. Motorway is based in London and Brighton in the UK.

History 

Motorway was founded in July 2017 by Tom Leathes, Alex Buttle and Harry Jones, who had previously created Top10, a broadband comparison site that was acquired by uSwitch in 2010.

Following an angel round of £500,000, Motorway launched in July 2017. The company subsequently raised £2.75 million at seed level funding, with investors including LocalGlobe, a seed stage venture firm founded by Robin Klein and Marchmont Ventures (founded by Momondo and Cheapflights CEO Hugo Burge).

The brand raised a further £11 million in Series A funding in 2019, with investors again led by Marchmont Ventures and LocalGlobe. This brought the company's total funding up to £14.3 million.

The founders announced in January 2020 that the service was receiving over 100,000 enquiries per month.

During the COVID-19 pandemic, Motorway was forced to stop trading in March 2020 following the UK national lockdown. Trading resumed in May 2020 with contact-free transport to align with social distancing rules.

By June 2020, Motorway reported £1.39m in used car sales on the platform per day.

In March 2021, Lloyd Page, previously MoneySupermarket’s Marketing Director, joined Motorway as CMO.

In June 2021, Motorway raised £48m in Series B funding led by Index Ventures, BMW i Ventures and Unbound. At funding completion, Danny Rimer, partner at Index Ventures, joined Motorway’s board.

In October 2021, Motorway announced its recent financial results to Bloomberg News, revealing $1 billion of sales expected in 2021, with $2 billion projected for the following year.

In November 2021, Motorway raised $190m in a Series C funding round co-led by Index Ventures and ICONIQ Growth, valuing the business at over $1bn and seeing the company become a unicorn startup. The press reported that in 2022 they started selling more than 1,000 cars a day.

Research 

In January 2018, Motorway released a report on diesel prices, showing the value of diesel vehicles had declined by 5% in 2017, compared to a 10% price increase in petrol car prices. Some diesel cars fell in value by 26.3%. The figures were linked with taxes on diesel vehicles, introduced that year by the UK government.  A new study in 2019 found that used diesel cars had declined in value by 10.3% over the last two years.

The company also launched a major investigation into the “price chipping” practices used by second-hand car dealers and online car buyers. The research showed that the price consumers were offered online was higher than the amount they actually received, with the average drop across all companies surveyed being 6%.  Cars valued under £5,000 could be “chipped down” by as much as 11%.

Platform 
Motorway's website is a two-sided marketplace platform for private car-selling customers and verified dealers who buy cars from them.

The customer portal allows users to receive a vehicle valuation by sharing their car registration and mileage. Motorway provides this figure based on the data from its own marketplace and current market trends. When the car is listed on Motorway's sales platform, verified dealers can place their bids. The car is then collected for delivery to the dealership which makes the highest bid.

The dealer portal is restricted to professional car dealers. Dealers become notified of cars that suit their requirements once they become available, and place offers in a daily online sale.

Awards 

 Used Car Product of the Year—Car Dealer Magazine, Used Car Awards 2019;
 IT Innovation of the Year, Retail & Wholesale—Motor Trader Industry Awards 2020;
 Used Car Product of the Year—Car Dealer Magazine, Used Car Awards 2020;
 Product Innovation of the Year—Car Dealer Magazine, Power Awards 2021;
 Used Online Car Trading Platform of the Year—Motor Trader Awards 2021;
 Used Online Car Trading Platform of the Year—Motor Trader Awards 2022
 FT1000: Europe’s Fastest Growing Companies 2023

Advertising 
Motorway's first TV advert was shown in May 2019 and was aired across commercial TV until the end of that year.

In August 2021, Motorway launched a nationwide marketing campaign, with a TV ad airing across all major UK commercial channels.

In January 2022, Motorway announced it was the sponsor of ITV's Six Nations Championship rugby coverage across 2022 and 2023.

In July 2022, Motorway announced it was the sponsor of BT Sport's broadcast coverage across 2022 and 2023 of the Premier League and UEFA Europa League.

References

See also
 Car dealership
 Auto Trader Group
 We Buy Any Car
 What Car?

Automotive companies of the United Kingdom
Used car market
Retail companies established in 2017
Internet properties established in 2017